The 1914 Rose Polytechnic football team represented the Rose Polytechnic Institute during the 1914 college football season.

Schedule

References

Rose Polytechnic
Rose–Hulman Fightin' Engineers football seasons
College football winless seasons
Rose Polytechnic football